Tysfjord is a former municipality in Nordland county, Norway. The municipality existed from 1869 until its dissolution in 2020. The municipality was part of the traditional district of Ofoten. The administrative centre of the municipality was the village of Kjøpsvik. Other villages included Drag, Hundholmen, Korsnes, Musken, Rørvika, Skarberget, and Storå.

Tysfjord had a very large population of Lule Sami people. The Árran Lule Sami Center was located in the village of Drag. With the Norwegian language and Lule Sami language both as official languages of the municipality, Tysfjord was the only municipality in Norway where speakers of Lule Sami should theoretically be able to speak that language with officials, although this has not come completely to fruition.

At the time of its dissolution, the  municipality was the 56th largest by area out of the 422 municipalities in Norway. Tysfjord was the 330th most populous municipality in Norway with a population of 1,953.

General information

The municipality of Tysfjord was established on 1 January 1869 when it was separated from the large Lødingen Municipality. Initially, the population of Tysfjord was 1,402. During the 1960s, there were many municipal mergers across Norway due to the work of the Schei Committee. On 1 January 1964, the Tysnes and Molvika areas (population: 33) located northwest of Bognes was transferred from the neighboring Hamarøy Municipality to Tysfjord Municipality.

On 1 January 2020, the municipality was dissolved and divided between the neighboring municipalities of Narvik and Hamarøy. This occurred because in 2017, the Parliament of Norway decided that Tysfjord would be divided along the fjord with the eastern half being merged with the neighboring municipalities of Narvik and Ballangen to form a new, larger municipality of Narvik and the remaining western half will be merged with the municipality of Hamarøy on the same date.

Name
The municipality (originally the parish) is named after the local Tysfjorden since it was a central geographical feature in the area. There are several ideas on the derivation of the name. Historically, the name was spelled in Norwegian as Tyttisfjiorden. One thought is that the first element was the old name for the fjord  which may have come from the verb  which means "blowing" (as in wind) or "rushing". Another thought is that the name Tysfjord is a Norwegianized form of the Lule Sami language name for the fjord, . Another popular belief is that the Norwegian name is derived from the genitive case of the name of the Old Norse god Týr, but is the least plausible since the name Týr does not seem fit either with the Sami form or the oldest Norwegian spellings of the name.

Coat of arms
The coat of arms was granted on 31 July 1987. The official blazon is "Argent, a lobster sable issuant from the base". This means the arms have a field (background) that has a tincture of argent which means it is commonly colored white, but if it is made out of metal, then silver is used. The charge is a lobster. The lobster was chosen because Tysfjord is the northernmost location of lobster habitat in the world. The original drawing included a lobster with claws of different size, such as they are in the natural population of lobsters in Tysfjord, but the National Archives opted for the same size claws to meet the standard heraldic conventions. The arms were designed by Esther Skoglund. The municipality originally adopted a design that showed Stetind mountain, but this was not approved by the National Archives, so the lobster design was chosen instead.

Churches
The Church of Norway had three parishes within the municipality of Tysfjord. It was part of the Ofoten prosti (deanery) in the Diocese of Sør-Hålogaland.

History
There are prehistoric rock carvings at Leiknes showing scenes of hunting, and the world's oldest known depiction of an orca whale. 

In 1948, an investigation that had lasted for years, was dismissed in regards to "a large group of Sami from Tysfjord".
These individuals had worked as guides—guiding Norwegians who chose to flee into Sweden.

In 2016, media uncovered the sexual abuse of 11 women; this was followed by more reports of sexual abuse—the Tysfjord Affair.. 92 persons were the suspects, in regard to 151 cases of sexual abuse from the 1950s to 2017; at least 2 persons have been convicted. Around two-thirds of the victims and alleged abusers were Sami. 40 cases dealt with sexual intercourse with underage children.

Ethnicity
A 2004 article in Avisa Nordland estimated that out of 2,209 inhabitants, between 600 and 1000 are Sami.

Government
While it existed, this municipality was responsible for primary education (through 10th grade), outpatient health services, senior citizen services, unemployment, social services, zoning, economic development, and municipal roads. During its existence, this municipality was governed by a municipal council of elected representatives, which in turn elected a mayor. The municipality fell under the Ofoten District Court and the Hålogaland Court of Appeal.

Municipal council
The municipal council of Tysfjord was made up of 17 representatives that were elected every four years. The party breakdown of the final municipal council was as follows:

Mayors
The mayors of Tysfjord:

 1869–1872: Peter Østbye
 1873–1880: Arnoldus Schjelderup
 1881–1882: Nikolai Norman
 1883–1884: Olaf Holm
 1885–1890: Johan Lagerfeldt
 1891–1892: Nikolai Norman
 1893–1896: Jens C. Davidsen
 1897–1898: Nikolai Norman 
 1898–1901: Waldemar Pettersen 
 1901–1907: Karl Aasebøstøl 
 1910–1913: Andreas Davidsen 
 1913–1916: Waldemar Pettersen 
 1916–1919: Haldor Jenssen
 1919–1928: Sigurd Storjord
 1928–1934: Kristen Aasebøstøl (H)
 1934–1941: Arnoldus Molvik (Ap)
 1941–1945: Torgils Moe 
 1945-1945: Høier Olsen (Ap)
 1946–1955: Kolbjørn Varmann (Ap)
 1955–1959: Olav Mathisen (Ap)
 1959–1968: Arne Solberg (Ap)
 1968-1968: Fritz Tørnes (Ap)
 1969-1971: Haldor Jenssen (Ap)
 1971–1979: Birger Skårvik (Ap)
 1979–1991: Edvard-Olav Stenbakk (Ap)
 1991–1995: Jan-Arild Skogvoll (Ap)
 1995–1999: Ivar Jakobsen (H)
 1999–2003: Leif Kristian Klæboe (SV)
 2003–2007: Kurt-Allan Nilsen (LL)
 2007–2011: Anders Sæter (Sp)
 2011–2019: Tor Asgeir Johansen (Ap)

Economy
Due to the limestone in Tysfjord, a cement factory was established with production starting in 1920.  The modern Norcem factory still is a vital employer in Kjøpsvik, with about 130 employees; since 1999 it has been a part of the German worldwide company Heidelberger Cement. Public services, some tourism, and agriculture are the other main sources of income in Tysfjord.

Geography
The municipality is located along the Tysfjorden. The municipality borders Ballangen in the north, Hamarøy in the south, Sweden in the east, and the Vestfjorden in the northwest. The island of Hulløya lies in the middle of the Tysfjorden.

The municipality is dominated by grey granite mountains; pine, birch, and aspen woodlands and forests; and the many fjord branches. Tysfjord's most dominant mountain, Stetind, is famous in Norway. In Norwegian, it is called  which means the 'anvil of the gods', partly because the summit forms a plateau. This was selected to be the national mountain of Norway in the autumn of 2002. The famous British climber William C. Slingsby described it as "the ugliest mountain I ever saw"; he did not reach the summit.

There are several nature reserves in Tysfjord. Mannfjordbotn reserve has undisturbed forests at the head of a narrow fjord branch surrounded by granite mountain walls. From Hellemobotn, at the head of Hellemofjorden, the distance to the border with Sweden is only ; this is also a scenic hiking terrain with a canyon opening up in Hellemobotn. There are also caves, such as the very deep Raggejavreraige. Lakes in the region include Baugevatnet, Båvrojávrre, Kilvatnet, Langvatnet, and Skilvatnet. Silver birch occurs in Tysfjord, as one of few areas in North Norway (silver birch need more summer warmth than the more common downy birch).

Nature

For many years since 1990, a large part of the stock of Norwegian herring has stayed in the fjord in winter, one of the largest gatherings of biomass in the world. Large number of whales, orcas in particular, have followed to feed on the herring. This has attracted winter tourists from far away, but not in huge numbers. Since 2008, less herring and fewer orca have arrived in Tysfjord. Harbor porpoises, lobsters, white-tailed eagles, common ravens, European otters, and moose are all common in the Tysfjord area.

The coastal municipality of Tysfjord is better known for its whale watching than its birdwatching but the region has still a lot to offer. Thanks to a range of habitats the area has a varied birdlife. Though the area has no large seabird colonies, there is a small nature reserve at Ramnholmen with breeding populations of Arctic tern and common tern.

Climate
The climate is surprisingly temperate considering the location north of the Arctic Circle. Summer is usually pleasant, although there might be persistent rain.

The midnight sun can be seen from the end of May to mid-July, and the sun is below the horizon from the beginning of December to mid-January. The aurora borealis is commonly seen in winter and late autumn.

Villages

Transport
Tysfjord is the only location in Norway where the European route E6 highway depends on a car ferry. There are ferry connections from Bognes to Skarberget (route E6) and from Bognes to Lødingen (connecting to route European route E10 and Lofoten). There is also a ferry connecting Drag south of the fjord with Kjøpsvik on the northern shore. Kjøpsvik is connected to the E6 highway and Narvik by Norwegian National Road 827, with no ferry crossings. This might be an alternative to route E6, and is also the route of choice to get close to the mountain Stetind. If Tysfjord experiences bad weather and the ferry connections are shut down, Norway is cut in two road-wise. A road connection is still maintained, albeit through Sweden, which makes it a very long drive.

The closest airport is Evenes. There was also a small airport in Narvik.

See also
List of former municipalities of Norway

References

External links

Municipal website 
Municipal fact sheet from Statistics Norway 
Unesco-Tysfjord on the tentative list
Summitpost: about Stetind (includes pictures)
About Stetind (includes pictures) 
Árran Lule Sami Center

 
Narvik
Hamarøy
Sámi-language municipalities
Former municipalities of Norway
1869 establishments in Norway
2020 disestablishments in Norway
Populated places disestablished in 2020